Palestinian legislature may refer to:

 Palestinian Legislative Council of the Palestinian National Authority
 Palestinian National Council of the Palestine Liberation Organization